The Bellvue-Watson Fish Hatchery is a Colorado Parks and Wildlife cold water fish production facility located near Cache la Poudre River and Watson Lake State Wildlife Area in Larimer County, Colorado. Hatchery staff works to support the raising of approximately 1.5 million sub-catchable trout annually. The Watson Lake Rearing Unit, a division within the hatchery, is responsible for rearing approximately 300,000 catchable trout each year. The hatchery stocks fishing sports in Wellington, Fort Collins, Loveland, Longmont and Jumbo Reservoir near Julesburg and Hale ponds.

This hatchery also contains Colorado's Fish Research Hatchery, which first began operation in 1968. The staff is responsible for the improvement of hatchery techniques and aquaculture advancement. Methods include conducting feed and fish strain performance evaluations and work to improve both rearing survival and post-stocking survival of hatchery fish. Various areas of study include whirling disease resistant strain research, broodstock, and optimization of production.

History
Bellvue-Watson was inaugurated in 1914 and its building was completed in 1924. The fish research hatchery followed these establishments in 1968. In September 2013 a flood devastated the hatchery, forcing it to close. After several years of repairs, the hatchery was able to reopen in 2017

Mission
An overarching mission among the hatchery staff is educating the public. The facilities provide fish for stock in many areas which supports angling recreation. The facility offers educational materials and tours. Along with this, hatchery technique advancement is a strong goal of the aquatic research facility.

Fish Species
The Bellvue-Watson hatchery raises catchable rainbow trout, cutthroat trout, splake, brown trout and rainbow/cutthroat trout hybrids. The aquatic research facility produces native cutthroat trout as well as strains of rainbow trout that are resistant to whirling disease.

References 

Fish hatcheries in the United States
Buildings and structures in Larimer County, Colorado
Tourist attractions in Colorado
Wildlife management areas of Colorado